Sunil Valson (born 2 October 1958) is a former Indian cricketer who was selected for the 1983 Cricket World Cup but was the only player in the squad who did not play a single match. He represented the state Tamil Nadu in 1981-82. He performed extremely well in that season and got 26 wickets in 5 matches. This performance helped him to select to South Zone in the Duleep and Deodhar Trophy, he performed well in those tournaments. In the next season he decided to represent Delhi. He performed reasonably well, overall with the performance for Tamil Nadu and Delhi helped him to get the nod for him the World Cup. He was the 12th man during the famous knock of 175 by Kapil Dev. Still, he did not get a chance to represent India. He later played for Railways and was part of the team that reached the 1987 Ranji Trophy Final.  He played 75 first-class cricket matches between 1977 and 1988. Valson is currently serving as team manager of Delhi Capitals.

In popular culture
R Badree portrayed Valson in 2021 film 83, a film based on India's World Cup win.

References

1958 births
Living people
Indian cricketers
Cricketers at the 1983 Cricket World Cup
North Zone cricketers
South Zone cricketers
Railways cricketers
Delhi cricketers
Tamil Nadu cricketers
People from Secunderabad
Cricketers from Hyderabad, India